= DuroCar Manufacturing Company =

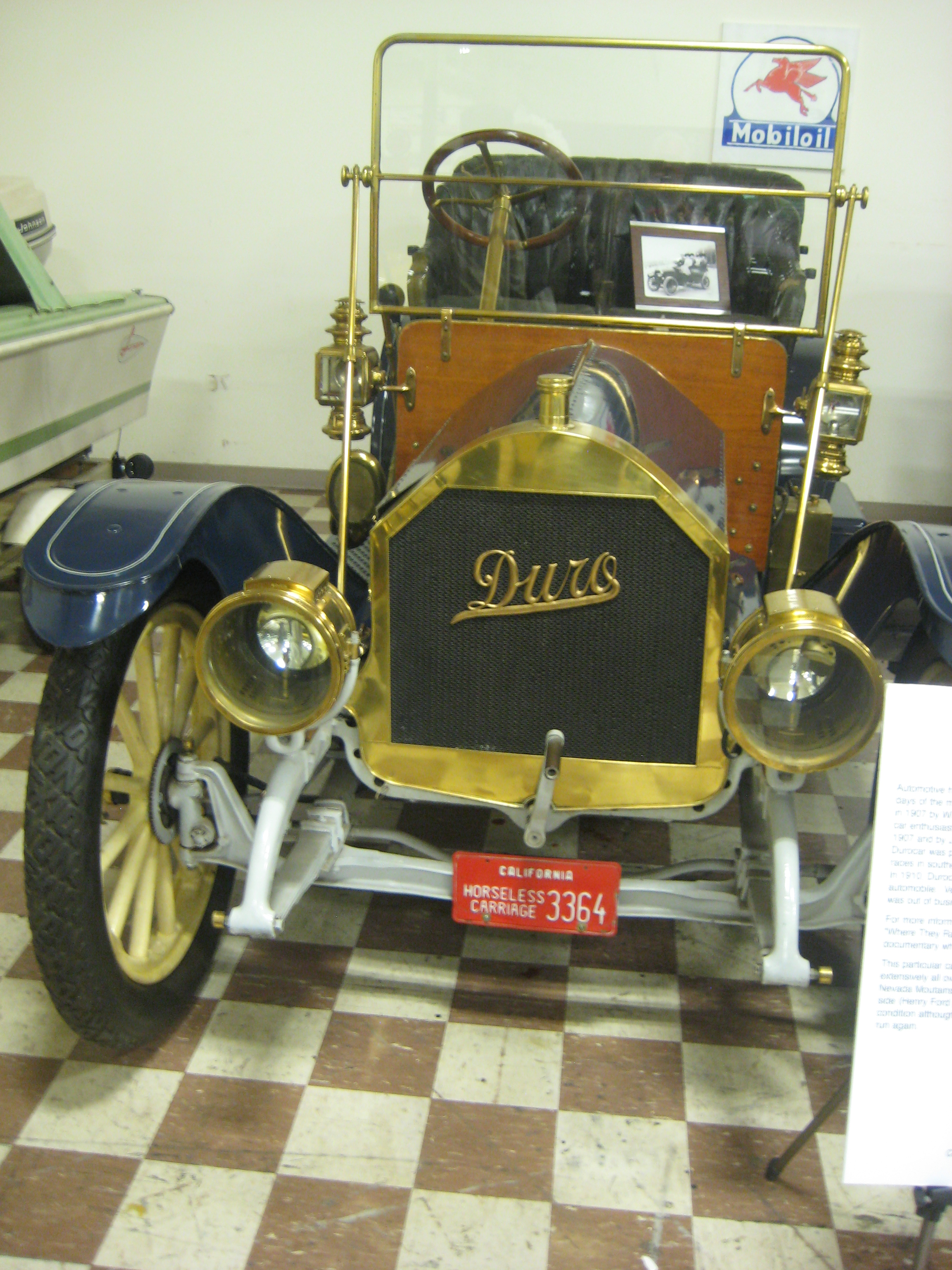
Durocar frontview 1910

The DuroCar Manufacturing Company was an automobile manufacturer from 1906 to 1911. The factory was located on Los Angeles street between Ninth street and Tenth street in Los Angeles, California. They produced 2,3 and 4 cylinder gasoline powered Durocar automobiles.

== Bibliography ==
- Kimes, Beverly Rae (1996). Standard Catalog of American Cars, 1805-1942. Krause Publications. ISBN 9780873414289.
